Sheohar Assembly constituency (Hindi pronunciation: Shivahar Vidhan Sabha Nirvachan Kshetra) is an assembly constituency in Sheohar district in the Indian state of Bihar.

Overview
As per orders of Delimitation of Parliamentary and Assembly constituencies Order, 2008, 22. Sheohar Assembly constituency is composed of the following:
Sheohar, Piprarhi, Dumri Katsari and Purnahiya community development blocks.

Sheohar Assembly constituency is part of 4. Sheohar (Lok Sabha constituency).

Members of Legislative Assembly

Election results

2020

References

External links
 

Assembly constituencies of Bihar
Politics of Sheohar district